James Mark Dakin Purnell (born 2 March 1970) is a British broadcasting executive and former Labour Party politician who served as Work and Pensions Secretary and Culture Secretary in the Brown Government from 2007 to 2009. In October 2016, he became BBC's Director of Radio, in addition to his other role as the BBC's Director of Strategy and Digital, a job he had held since March 2013. In 2020 he left the BBC to become vice-chancellor of University of the Arts London.

Purnell was the Member of Parliament (MP) for Stalybridge and Hyde from the 2001 until the 2010 General Election. He served as Secretary of State for Culture, Media and Sport from 2007 to 2008 and Secretary of State for Work and Pensions from 2008 to 2009. He resigned from the Government on 4 June 2009, criticising the leadership of Gordon Brown.

He became the director of the Open Left project for Demos in 2009. Purnell chaired the Institute for Public Policy Research until 2010, and was a senior advisor in the Public Sector practice of the Boston Consulting Group. He is also a film producer, and a former Senior Producer at Rare Day, who produced the film One Mile Away.

Early life
Purnell was born in the City of London; he received most of his education in France before returning to study for his A Levels at the Royal Grammar School, Guildford, and then read Philosophy, politics and economics at Balliol College, Oxford. While a student, he worked during summer vacations as a researcher for Tony Blair between 1989 and 1992. After graduating from Oxford University with a first class degree, he worked as a research fellow at the Institute for Public Policy Research before moving to the BBC to become its Head of Corporate Planning.

Between May 1994 and October 1995, he was a Labour councillor in Islington, representing Canonbury East ward. In 1997, Purnell returned to work as a special adviser at Number 10, remaining in the post until 2001. He has also served as a consultant at Hydra Associates, a board member of the Young Vic theatre as well as of the Royal National Theatre and the British Film Institute, and as a senior advisor to Boston Consulting Group.

Member of Parliament
Purnell was selected as the Labour candidate for the seat of Stalybridge and Hyde in 2001, and won the seat in that year's general election with a majority of 8,859. While a Labour MP, he was a member of the Work and Pensions Select Committee in the House of Commons from 2001 to 2003, the Chair of the All-Party Group on Private Equity and Venture Capital between 2002 and 2003, and the Chair of Labour Friends of Israel from 2002 to 2004.

In government

In 2003, Purnell became Parliamentary Private Secretary (PPS) to Ruth Kelly in the Cabinet Office, and in December 2004 he joined the Government as a Whip in the government reshuffle following the resignation of David Blunkett.

After Labour was returned to power in the 2005 general election, he was appointed to the position of Parliamentary Under-Secretary of State for Creative Industries and Tourism in the Department for Culture, Media and Sport, where he was in charge of preparing the legislation that liberalised the alcohol licensing laws of England and Wales and created tax breaks for the film industry. In May 2006, he was promoted to be Minister of State for Pensions in the Department for Work and Pensions, replacing Stephen Timms.

In 2007, he was named Consumer Champion of the Year by Which? magazine for his work on pensions. Which? cited his "commitment to consumers in the development of the national pensions saving scheme", particularly for listening to stakeholders and for his contributions to the personal accounts for low and middle earners.

In June 2007, Purnell entered the Cabinet as the Secretary of State for Culture, Media and Sport; he was its youngest member. He was promoted to Work and Pensions Secretary after the resignation of Peter Hain on 24 January 2008.

Faked photograph
In September 2007 Tameside General Hospital inserted Purnell into a photograph, as part of a press release for a Private Finance Initiative (PFI) deal.  Tameside Trust claimed that he agreed to the insertion being late for the original photo call, Purnell denied this.  Tom Levitt, a Labour MP who was present for the photoshoot, stated that he and other MPs left a gap for Purnell when the photograph was taken, knowing that Purnell's image would be added.

Interest on crisis loans proposal
In December 2008, Purnell proposed charging interest on crisis loans to the unemployed and pensioners made by the Department for Work and Pensions, which were interest-free, at a rate of up to 26.8% per annum. This was met with great hostility and was blocked by the intervention of the prime minister, Gordon Brown.

Expenses scandal
Purnell was one of many MPs involved in political difficulties following the revelations of the 2009 expenses scandal. He told the parliamentary authorities that his main home was in Manchester and claimed the "second home" allowance for his flat in London. In October 2004, he sold his London flat but told HM Revenue and Customs it was his "principal home", not his "second home". A spokesman on behalf of Purnell said that "Any allegation that James avoided capital gains tax is completely untrue. When he bought his constituency home, the sale of his London flat fell through, but it was sold within the period that HMRC continue to treat it as not being liable for CGT ... This would have been true for any taxpayer – there was no special treatment". Also in 2004, Purnell claimed £395 for an accountant's bill which included "tax advice provided in October 2004 regarding sale of flat".

Whilst renting a flat between 2004 and 2006, Purnell claimed £100 a month for cleaning expenses and £586 for repairs. At the end of the lease, the landlord kept the £2,520 deposit, claiming the flat to have been in a poor state. A spokesman for Purnell stated: "James felt frustrated that the landlord refused to return the deposit. He initially pursued the matter through legal channels but let it rest as the costs of fighting it further would far outweigh recouping the deposit". Allegation were made by a Sunday newspaper that Purnell claimed more than £1,500 a month rent for the flat although he was responsible for paying half of the £1,820 a month rent and his fiancée was paying the rest. A spokesman for Purnell said "Despite being entitled to claim in full for the whole rental cost incurred by him and his partner, James claimed less than the amount he himself spent. The rules of the House of Commons make it clear that an MP is entitled to be reimbursed for the rent or mortgage paid by the MP and their partner. Nevertheless, James went out of his way to ensure overall he claimed less for accommodation than he himself paid". Purnell also claimed £247 for 3,000 fridge magnets.

Resignation from the Cabinet
On 4 June 2009, Purnell announced his resignation from the Cabinet, and called upon Gordon Brown to resign as Prime Minister. His resignation came only days after the resignations of Home Secretary Jacqui Smith, whose expenses had been the subject of negative comments, and Communities Secretary Hazel Blears, who had also avoided paying capital gains tax on her property.
The news came just minutes after polls closed in the local and European elections, in which Labour performed badly.
His letter to the Prime Minister, which was also sent to The Sun and The Times, read:

Post-parliamentary career
On 19 February 2010, Purnell announced he would be standing down as an MP later that year, saying "I have decided that I no longer wish to be an MP. I have spent all my working life in or about Westminster. And while this has been a huge privilege, I've realised I don't want to have spent all my life in frontline politics." He pointed to his work with Demos as occupying him in the immediate future.

After leaving parliament, Purnell became the chair of the Institute for Public Policy Research. It was touted that he would stand for the Labour candidacy to become Mayor of London, but he decided against this option. He supported David Miliband in the 2010 Labour leadership election and worked for his campaign, although he was subsequently offered the job of chief of staff to the new leader of the Labour Party, Ed Miliband, a job he turned down.

Purnell became linked with the Blue Labour movement within the Labour Party and in April 2011 he was appointed by the Boston Consulting Group as a Special Advisor to their Public Sector Group. In July 2011, he appeared on Newsnight with proposals for welfare reforms, as part of his involvement in Blue Labour. He called for a National Salary Insurance, a job guarantee and free universal childcare, but also said that "freebies" such as Winter Fuel Allowance and free bus passes should not become sacred. He did not rule out returning to Parliament in 2015, but declared his support for Ed Miliband and his leadership.

BBC career
In February 2013 Purnell left the IPPR in order to rejoin the BBC as its Director of Strategy, on a salary of £295,000; he assumed this position on 20 March. As a senior BBC employee he had to resign his membership of the Labour Party.

An Employment Tribunal for unfair dismissal was brought by the BBC's former Chief Technology Officer, John Linwood, when he lost his job in 2013 after the Corporation's £100m Digital Media Initiative failed. During the case an email from Purnell was cited in evidence, which read: "We need a clear line on [John Linwood] on whether he is resigning or being fired and why". The tribunal's response to this was: "It was notable that there was no third option in Purnell's mind, such as a different disciplinary outcome." The tribunal found the BBC's processes to have given an "apparently cavalier disregard for any of the accepted norms of a fair disciplinary process", and that there was a "deeply ingrained cultural expectation within the organisation of sacrificial accountability". Linwood was awarded £80,000 in damages, and it was later revealed that the BBC had spent £498,000 defending the claim.

In late September 2016, Purnell was appointed as the BBC's Director of Radio and Education, in succession to Helen Boaden. He took up his new position in late October 2016. The Daily Telegraph described a key facet of his role as attracting younger listeners and viewers to the BBC.

In September 2020 the new director-general Tim Davie removed Purnell from his new smaller executive board. Purnell left the BBC that year to become president and vice-chancellor of University of the Arts London in spring 2021.

References

External links
The Guardian: Purnell's progress
Guardian Unlimited Politics - Ask Aristotle: James Purnell MP
TheyWorkForYou.com - James Purnell MP
 

|-

|-

1970 births
Living people
British atheists
Alumni of Balliol College, Oxford
Labour Party (UK) officials
British special advisers
Councillors in the London Borough of Islington
Labour Party (UK) councillors
Labour Party (UK) MPs for English constituencies
Labour Friends of Israel
British Secretaries of State
People educated at Royal Grammar School, Guildford
Politics of Tameside
UK MPs 2001–2005
UK MPs 2005–2010
BBC executives
Secretaries of State for Work and Pensions
Members of the Privy Council of the United Kingdom
Members of the Parliament of the United Kingdom for Stalybridge and Hyde